Kenneth Marshall Walsh (born February 11, 1945) is an American former competition swimmer, two-time Olympic gold medalist, and former world record-holder in three events.

Career

Walsh was born in Orange, New Jersey, and grew up in Ponte Vedra Beach, Florida.  He attended Michigan State University in East Lansing, Michigan, where he swam for coach Charles McCaffree's Michigan State Spartans swimming and diving team in National Collegiate Athletic Association (NCAA) competition from 1965 to 1967.  During his three-year college career, he received twelve All-American honors, and won Big Ten Conference championships in the 100-meter freestyle (1965, 1967), 200-meter freestyle (1967), and 4×100-meter freestyle relay (1967).  As a college senior in 1967, he won the NCAA national championship in the 100-yard freestyle.  Later that same year, he set a new world record (52.6 seconds) in the 100-meter freestyle at the 1967 Pan American Games.

At the 1968 Summer Olympics in Mexico City, Walsh won two gold medals in relay events and a silver medal in individual competition.  He won the first of his two gold medals by swimming the anchor leg for the winning U.S. team in the men's 4×100-meter freestyle relay, together with teammates Zac Zorn, Stephen Rerych and Mark Spitz.  He won his second gold medal by swimming the final freestyle leg for the first-place U.S. team in the men's 4×100-meter medley relay, together with teammates Charlie Hickcox (backstroke), Don McKenzie (breaststroke), and Doug Russell (butterfly).  The two U.S. relay teams set new world records in both events.  Walsh also captured a silver medal for his second-place performance (52.8 seconds) in the men's 100-meter freestyle event, finishing six tenths (0.60) of a second behind winner Mike Wenden of Australia, and two tenths (0.20) of a second ahead of fellow American Mark Spitz.  Wenden set a new world record in the event, eclipsing Walsh's previous mark from 1967.

See also

 List of Michigan State University people
 List of Olympic medalists in swimming (men)
 World record progression 100 metres freestyle
 World record progression 4 × 100 metres freestyle relay
 World record progression 4 × 100 metres medley relay

References
 

1945 births
Living people
American male freestyle swimmers
World record setters in swimming
Michigan State Spartans men's swimmers
Olympic gold medalists for the United States in swimming
Olympic silver medalists for the United States in swimming
People from Ponte Vedra Beach, Florida
Swimmers at the 1967 Pan American Games
Swimmers at the 1968 Summer Olympics
Medalists at the 1968 Summer Olympics
Pan American Games gold medalists for the United States
Pan American Games medalists in swimming
Universiade medalists in swimming
Universiade gold medalists for the United States
Medalists at the 1967 Summer Universiade
Medalists at the 1967 Pan American Games
People from Orange, New Jersey